Arjun Lal (born 7 February 1997 in Nayabas village of Jaipur district in Rajasthan) is an Indian rower. He is currently serving in the Indian Army.

In 2019 Asian Rowing Championships in Chungju, Arjun along with Arvind Singh won their first international medal (Silver).

2020 Summer Olympics 
Arjun qualified for the 2020 Summer Olympic Games after finishing second at the Asia/Oceania Continental Qualifying Regatta  event in Tokyo, Japan and on the allocation of an Asian & Oceania Qualification Regatta spots and now he will represent India Team at  the Men's Lightweight double sculls Event  in Rowing at the 2020 Summer Olympics of the 2020 Summer Olympics in Tokyo, Japan.

References

Living people
1997 births
Indian male rowers
Sportspeople from Rajasthan
Rowers at the 2020 Summer Olympics
Olympic rowers of India